For the 2002 Tour de France, the selection was done as follows:  was selected because it included the winner (prior to disqualification) of the previous edition, Lance Armstrong.  was selected because it included the winner of the 2001 UCI Road World Cup (Erik Dekker). This was extended to 16 teams based on the UCI ranking in the highest UCI division at the end of 2001, after compensating for transfers. The teams selected in this way were: Five more teams were given wildcards by the organisation. After the wildcards were given, it was announced that Saeco's main rider Gilberto Simoni had tested positive for cocaine on two occasions.

In total, 21 teams participated, each with 9 cyclists, for a total of 189 cyclists.

Teams

Qualified teams

Invited teams

Cyclists

By starting number

By team

By nationality

References

2002 Tour de France
2002